Manley "Ross" Petty was an American football guard who played one season for the Decatur Staleys of the National Football League. He played college football at the University of Illinois for the Illinois Fighting Illini football team.

External links
Ross Petty Bio (Staley Museum)

References

1892 births
1966 deaths
American football guards
Decatur Staleys players
Illinois Fighting Illini football players
Players of American football from Illinois
People from Sumner, Illinois